Edgar Mariano Trujillo Reyes (born May 19, 1977, in Mexico City) is a Mexican former professional footballer and current analyst for Fox Deportes.

Career

Professional
Trujillo made his professional debut with UNAM Pumas on October 26, 1996, in a 3–0 win over Toluca. In the Verano 2001 he transferred to Santos Laguna, when Santos won the Verano 2001 championship. Trujillo went back with Pumas in the Invierno 2001, where he would leave until the 2003 Apertura to Monarcas Morelia. With Morelia he would play until the 2007 Clausura, and would feature in more games than with any other team.

In 2007, Trujillo signed a 2-year contract with Skoda Xanthi of Greece, but for personal reasons, he left the team. Trujillo played with Atlante for the Clausura 2008.

He signed for Chivas USA in March 2009, just before the new season. Trujillo started 18 games and made three substitution appearances for Chivas USA in his first season. He became a regular starter for the team in his second year, and inherited Jonathan Bornstein's role as captain when Bornstein was not active.

Trujillo remained with Chivas USA through the 2011 season. At season's end, the club declined his 2012 contract option and he entered the 2011 MLS Re-Entry Draft. Trujillo was not selected in the draft and became a free agent.

Mariano is now a member of Jaguares de Chiapas, Mexican soccer club. No longer an active player, Jose Guadalupe (Jaguares Head Coach) has integrated Mariano to his Coaching Staff upon the 2012 Liga MX season to start July, 20th. Jaguares's coach Jose Guadalupe Cruz saw him play during a training session with the other players so he convinced Mariano Trujillo to be a team player for the Copa Mexico where he gave an assist to Antonio Salazar in a 1–0 win at home against Necaxa on July 24, 2012.

International
Trujillo played two games with the Mexico national team in 2003, his first against El Salvador in Carson, California. He scored his only international goal in a friendly match against Peru in East Rutherford, New Jersey. Trujillo was also a member of Mexico's U-20 squad at the 1997 World Youth Championship in Malaysia, alongside former Chivas USA forward Eduardo Lillingston.

International goals

|- 
| 1. || August 20, 2003 || Giants Stadium, East Rutherford, United States ||  || 1–3 || 1–3 || Friendly
|}

Honours
Santos Laguna
 Primera División de México: Verano 2001

Mexico Youth
 Central American and Caribbean Games: Silver medalist

References

External links
 
 
 
 

Living people
1977 births
Mexico under-20 international footballers
Atlante F.C. footballers
Chivas USA players
Mexican expatriate footballers
Mexican footballers
Expatriate footballers in Greece
Liga MX players
Major League Soccer players
Atlético Morelia players
Footballers from Mexico City
Santos Laguna footballers
Xanthi F.C. players
Club Universidad Nacional footballers
Chiapas F.C. footballers
Mexican expatriate sportspeople in the United States
Expatriate soccer players in the United States
Association football fullbacks
Mexico international footballers